Thomas Caito is a former American football coach.  He was the first the head football coach at Merrimack College in North Andover, Massachusetts, serving from 1996 to 2002 and compiling a record of 34–33.  Before he was hired at Merrimack, Caito was the head football coach at Chelmsford High School in Chelmsford, Massachusetts for 17 years.

Head coaching record

College

References

Year of birth missing (living people)
Living people
Boston University Terriers football players
Merrimack Warriors football coaches
High school football coaches in Massachusetts